Francisco de Ascensão Mendonça (30 May 1889 - 28 September 1982) was a Portuguese botanist.

References

Further reading

20th-century Portuguese botanists
1889 births
1982 deaths